Athmallik is a town and a notified area committee and one of the four subdivisions of Angul district in the state of Odisha, India.

History 

Athmallik was initially an estate (jagir) which was recognized as a princely state in 1874. Athmallik was one of the 26 feudatory states of Odisha. Kaintragarh was the capital of Athmallik State, being carved out of the erstwhile Baudh ex-feudatory state. In the 11th century, it became a separate princely state, established by King Prattap Deo, a scion of the Kadamba Dynasty. Prattap Deo was said to have found a Honda (Metal Vessel) which was considered to be lucky enough, after which the territory was then named as "Hondpa". In the course of time, one of the chiefs divided the ex-state into eight divisions and placed one sub-chief called "Malla" in each division with a view of suppressing the unruly tribes; on this basis the kingdom changed its name from "Hondpa" to "Athmallik".  The state merged with Dhenknal from the rule of Kishore Chandra Dev in 1948 and remained under Dhenkanal District until 31 March 1993. Due to bifurcation of the District Athmallik, a Sub-Division, is now under Angul District, as from 1993.

Rajas 
Rajas of the princedom are as follows:.

 Jogendra Samant (1874 - 1877)right
 Mahendra Deo Samant (4 Feb 1877 - 190.)
 Bibhendra Deo Samant (190.- 3 Nov 1918)
 Kishor Chandra Deo Samant (b. 1904)  (3 Nov 1918 – 15 Aug 1947)
 Raja Surajmani Deo Samant (b. 1995)

Demographics 
 India census, Athmallik had a population of 11,383. Males constitute 52% of the population and females 48%. Athmallik has an average literacy rate of 65%, higher than the national average of 59.5%; with 59% of the males and 41% of females literate. 13% of the population is under 6 years of age.

Outstanding personalities 
Athmallik is the birthplace of the internationally renowned Swedish artist Pradyumna Mahandia. Mahanndia was the portrait painter of Indira Gandhi before he went away to Sweden on a bicycle to reunite with his Swedish wife, Charlotte “Lotta” von Schedvin . Sanjay Leela Bhansali is a making a film on Mahandia's early life in Athmallik.

How to Go 
Athmallik is located at 235 km from Bhubaneswar, 200 km from Cuttack and 160 km from Sambalpur and is well connected by road. The nearest railhead is at Boinda, 36 km from here, connected with the major cities of India. Nearest Airport is at Bhubaneswar.

Accommodation 
A circuit house (reservation authority is Sub-Collector, Athmallik), an Inspection Bungalow of public works department (reservation authority is Executive Engineer, R & B, Dhenkanal), a Guest house of Manjore Irrigation Project (reservation authority Executive Engineer) and a dharmasala managed by NAC provide accommodation facilities to the tourists. However the comfort loving travellers are advised to stay at Angul and cover the shrine in a day by hiring a vehicle.

Education
Athmallik has several educational institutions. It houses many Oriya, Hindi, and English-medium schools (School).
Athamallik College (Junior & Degree) is the key centre for education in this area.

References

Bibliography
Pasayat, C. (1994), "Myth and Reality in Little Tradition: A Study of Dandanata in Orissa" in Man in India, Vol.74, No.4, December 1994, pp. 413–427.

External links

Cities and towns in Angul district